Ket or KET may refer to:

People 
Ket people, a people of Siberia
Ket language, the language of the Ket people
Ket Sivan (born 1981), Cambodian swimmer who specialized in sprint freestyle events

Places 
Ket (river), a river in Siberia
Keť, a village in south-west Slovakia

Literature 
Ket (Greyhawk), a fictional nation in the Dungeons and Dragons World of Greyhawk campaign setting
Ket and Wig, figures in the Gesta Danorum Danish history

Mythology 
Cet mac Mágach, a character in Irish myth
A name of the Celtic legendary figure Ceridwen

Other uses 
KET, or Kentucky Educational Television, a non-commercial public television network
Ketamine, a general dissociative anaesthetic
Kettering railway station (National Rail station code KET), a station serving the town of Kettering in Northamptonshire, England
Kengtung Airport, Burma/Myanmar (IATA airport code KET)
Kennedy Town station (MTR station code KET), a station serving the suburb of Kennedy Town in Hong Kong
Key English Test, an international examination sanctioning a basic level of the English language
Key Enabling Technology, the technology that underlies the production of given goods or services
Ket vallomas or Two Confessions, a 1957 Hungarian crime film
The right part of bra–ket notation, 
Ket (software), an open source algebra editor

See also 
Kit (disambiguation)

Language and nationality disambiguation pages